The Queen's Law Journal is a Canadian peer-reviewed law review. The Journal is published by Queen's University at Kingston in Kingston, Ontario, Canada

The Journal was established in 1968 as the Queen's Intramural Law Journal. The purpose of this periodical was to publish a selection of the best work written by law students at Queen's. In 1971, the title was changed to the Queen's Law Journal, reflecting a change in editorial policy. While it continued to publish student work, the Journal began seeking contributions from academics and other members of the legal profession.

By the mid-1970s, the Journal had evolved into its present form—a vehicle for scholarship by legal academics, practitioners, and law students. In time, the Journal became a fully refereed publication. All submissions that pass the internal review process are subject to a double-blind external assessment by at least two experts in the relevant subject area.

External links
 Queen's Law Journal Website

Canadian law journals
Queen's University at Kingston